Trivialization or trivialisation may refer to:
 Trivialization (mathematics), a trivialization of a fiber bundle
 Trivialization (psychology), a form of minimization, a cognitive distortion